Mycale cartwrighti is a species of demosponge first found on the coast of South Georgia island, in the south west Southern Ocean.

References

External links
WORMS

Poecilosclerida